Ad. Viqueque or Associação Desportiva Viqueque is a football club of East Timor come from Viqueque. The team plays in the Taça Digicel.

References

Football clubs in East Timor
Football
Association football clubs established in 2010
2010 establishments in East Timor
Viqueque Municipality